The crested finchbill (Spizixos canifrons) is a species of songbird in the bulbul family, Pycnonotidae. It is found in south-eastern Asia from China and India to Indochina.

Taxonomy
The crested finchbill was formally described in 1845 by the English zoologist Edward Blyth under the binomial name Spizixos canifrons. He specified the type locality as Cherrapunji in the Indian state of Meghalaya of northeast India. The specific epithet combines the Latin canus meaning "grey" with frons meaning "forehead".

Subspecies
Two subspecies are recognized:
 S. c. canifrons Blyth, 1845 – Found in north-eastern India and western Myanmar
 S. c. ingrami Bangs & Phillips, JC, 1914 – Found in eastern Myanmar, southern China and northern Indochina

References

External links
 Image and Classification at Animal Diversity Web

crested finchbill
Birds of Northeast India
Birds of Yunnan
Birds of Myanmar
Birds of Laos
crested finchbill
crested finchbill
Taxonomy articles created by Polbot